Alberto Lombardi (21 August 1893 – 10 April 1975) was an Italian horse rider who competed in the 1924 Summer Olympics. In 1924 he and his horse Pimplo won the bronze medal in the team eventing competition, after finishing eleventh in the individual eventing.

References

External links
 
 
 
 

1893 births
1975 deaths
Italian event riders
Olympic equestrians of Italy
Italian male equestrians
Equestrians at the 1924 Summer Olympics
Olympic bronze medalists for Italy
Olympic medalists in equestrian
Medalists at the 1924 Summer Olympics
People from Dronero
Sportspeople from the Province of Cuneo